The palatization mark is one of the historic signs of Cyrillic that was used in Old Church Slavonic to indicate the palatalization of the base consonant. An example of use is in the word  ('redeemer', palatalized л ). It is not to be confused with the kamora, which resembles it, but indicates pitch accent.

Sources

See also 
Old Church Slavonic
Cyrillic characters in Unicode

Cyrillic-script diacritics
Old Church Slavonic language